The PRITV is a High-rise building in Szczecin, Poland, which belongs to Telewizja Polska. it was completed in 1980 and was the first high-rise in Szczecin.

The building is most noted for being one of the main buildings used by Polish Television. Many orchestras and ensembles have been recorded/played there, hence why you can see the word "PRiTV" next to some of Poland's Orchestra's names.

Skyscraper office buildings in Poland
Buildings and structures in Szczecin